Eppihus hippeus is a species of moth of the family Tortricidae. It is found in India (Jammu and Kashmir).

The ground colour of the forewings is whitish, hardly tinged pinkish cream terminally and strongly suffused with brownish-grey and strigulated with brownish in the basal half of the wing. The hindwings are pale brownish-grey, but dirty cream in the terminal third where it is also strigulated with brownish grey.

Etymology
The species name refers to the heavily armed valve and is derived from Latin hippeus (meaning knight).

References

External links

Moths described in 2006
Moths of Asia
Olethreutini
Taxa named by Józef Razowski